The Kasbah of Agadir Oufla (Agadir Uflla) is a historical landmark in Agadir, Morocco that housed the old city of Agadir, much of which was affected by the earthquake that struck the city. The fort is located on the top of a mountain rising 236 meters above sea level in the north of the town of Agadir near the current port.

Name 
Agadir Oufla is the local name of the Kasbah of Agadir. The word "Agadir" means "fort", and "Oufla" is an Amazigh word meaning "above". Agadir Ofla, therefore, implies the fortress at the top.

History 
Prior to the fortification of the site by the Sa'dis, the Portuguese nobleman João Lopes de Sequeira occupied the area in 1505. He built a wooden castle at the foot of a hill and a Portuguese colony named Santa Cruz do Cabo do Gué was created. The castle was later bought by the King of Portugal in 1513. Their presence elicited growing hostility from the local population of the Sous, until in 1540 the Sa'di sultan Muhammad al-Shaykh occupied the main hill above the city and installed artillery to prepare an attack on the Portuguese fortress below. The siege began in February 1541 and was successfully concluded in March. The site was then left unoccupied for years until Muhammad's successor, Abdallah al-Ghalib (r. 1557–1574), built a new fortress on the hilltop.

The Kasbah was destroyed for the first time in November 1755 during Lisbon earthquake, and again in 1960, during Agadir earthquake.

Components of the fort before the 1960 earthquake 
The fortress of the Kasbah of Agadir Ouflla before the earthquake consisted of:

 The outer wall is supported by towers and has a twisted door designed for defensive purposes.
 Great Mosque.
 Hospital.
Treasury and postal building
Houses, alleys and junior yards.
Mallah, a Jewish neighborhood
Shrines, the most important one is the mausoleum of Sidi Boudjemaa Aknaou.
Mausoleum of Lala Yamna

Gallery

References  

Agadir
Kasbahs in Morocco